Seyyed Hoseyn Musavi (also Romanized as Seyyed Ḩoseyn Mūsavī) is a village in Jahad Rural District, Hamidiyeh District, Ahvaz County, Khuzestan Province, Iran. At the 2006 census, its population was 758, in 126 families.

References 

Populated places in Ahvaz County